The Ukrainian Cup 1991 was the 26th and the last annual edition of the Ukrainian SSR football knockout competition, known as the Ukrainian Cup. The competition started on March 30, 1991, and its final took place on November 24, 1991. It was a second edition of the tournament since its revival in 1990. The last year cup holder Polissia Zhytomyr was knocked out of the competition by Kryvbas Kryvyi Rih already in the second round.

The cup winner Temp Shepetivka was allowed to qualify for the 1992 Vyshcha Liha (Top League).

Teams

Tournament distribution
The competition was conducted by the clubs of 1991 Soviet Lower Second League, Zone 1 only.

Other professional teams
Many Ukrainian professional teams (19) in higher tiers of the Soviet football league pyramid did not take part in the competition.
 1991 Soviet Top League (6): FC Chornomorets Odesa, FC Dynamo Kyiv, FC Dnipro Dnipropetrovsk, FC Metalist Kharkiv, FC Metalurh Zaporizhia, FC Shakhtar Donetsk
 1991 Soviet First League (2): FC Bukovyna Chernivtsi, SC Tavriya Simferopol
 1991 Soviet Second League (11): FC Halychyna Drohobych, FC Karpaty Lviv, FC Kremin Kremenchuk, FC Nyva Ternopil, FC Nyva Vinnytsia, SKA Odessa, FC Sudnobudivnyk Mykolaiv, FC Torpedo Zaporizhia, FC Volyn Lutsk, FC Vorskla Poltava, FC Zorya Luhansk

Competition schedule

First round (1/16)
The first legs were played on 30 March, and the second legs were played on 2 April 1991.

|}

Notes
The following clubs received bye for the next round: Veres Rivne, Chaika Sevastopol, Karpaty Kamyanka-Buzka, Pryladyst Mukacheve, FC Temp Shepetivka, Avtomobilist Sumy.

Second round
The first legs were played on 29 April, and the second legs were played on 28 June 1991.

|}

Notes

Quarterfinals
The first legs were played on 24 July, and the second legs were played on 17 September 1991.

|}

Notes

Semifinals
The first legs were played on 16 November, and the second legs were played on 20 November 1991.

|}

Final

The first leg was played on 24 November, and the second leg was played on 28 November 1991.

|}

First leg

Second leg

Temp won 3–2 on aggregate

References

External links
 1991 Cup of the Ukrainian SSR
 Cup holders of the Ukrainian SSR

Football Cup of the Ukrainian SSR
1991 in Ukrainian football
1991 domestic association football cups